Nicky Degrendele (born 11 October 1996) is a Belgian professional track and road cyclist, who most recently rode for UCI Track Team . Most notably, she became world champion at the age of 21 in Women's Keirin at the 2018 UCI Track Cycling World Championships in Apeldoorn. She formerly rode for the  team; in October 2018 she joined .

Major results

2014
Belgian Xmas Meetings
1st Keirin
1st Sprint
1st Sprint, Grand Prix of Poland (U23)
Trofeu Ciutat de Barcelona
2nd Keirin
2nd Sprint
3rd Sprint, International Belgian Open
2015
Revolution – Round 2, Manchester
1st Keirin
1st Sprint
International Belgian Open
1st Keirin
3rd Sprint
3rd Keirin, Grand Prix of Poland
3rd Keirin, Trofeu CAR Anadia Portugal
Belgian Xmas Meetings
3rd Keirin
3rd Sprint
2016
1st Sprint, Track-Cycling Challenge Grenchen
Prova Internacional de Anadia
2nd Keirin
2nd Sprint
2nd Keirin, 6 giorni delle rose – Fiorenzuola
2nd Keirin, Grand Prix of Poland
3rd Keirin, Fenioux Piste International
2nd  Keirin, UEC European U23 Championships
2nd  Keirin, UEC European Track Championships
2017
National Track Championships
1st  500m time trial
1st  Keirin
1st Keirin, Troféu Internacional de Anadia
2nd Keirin, Belgian International Track Meeting
3rd  Keirin, UCI World Track Championships
3rd  Sprint – Minsk, UCI Track World Cup
Fenioux Piste International
3rd Sprint
3rd Keirin
2018
1st  Keirin, UCI Track Cycling World Championships
 UEC European Under-23 Track Championships
1st  Keirin
3rd  Sprint
International Belgian Track Meeting
1st Keirin
1st Sprint
2nd  Keirin, UEC European Track Championships
2022
National Track Championships
1st  Keirin

See also
List of 2015 UCI Women's Teams and riders

References

External links

1996 births
Living people
Belgian female cyclists
Place of birth missing (living people)
UCI Track Cycling World Champions (women)
Belgian track cyclists
Cyclists at the 2019 European Games
European Games competitors for Belgium
People from Knokke-Heist
Cyclists from West Flanders
21st-century Belgian women